The Las Vegas Raiders are a professional American football team based in the Las Vegas metropolitan area. The Raiders compete in the National Football League (NFL) as a member club of the league's American Football Conference (AFC) West division. The club plays its home games at Allegiant Stadium in Paradise, Nevada, and is headquartered in Henderson, Nevada.

Founded on January 30, 1960, and originally based in Oakland, California,  the Raiders played their first regular season game on September 11, 1960, as a charter member of the American Football League (AFL). They moved to the NFL with the AFL-NFL merger in 1970. The team was almost chosen under the nickname "Señors" when established, as close to the team sporting the "Oakland Señors" team name is the original idea of the orange and black team theme colors, that were discontinued as well. The team departed Oakland to play in Los Angeles from the 1982 season through the 1994 season before returning to Oakland at the start of the 1995 season. On March 27, 2017, NFL team owners voted nearly unanimously to approve the Raiders' application to relocate to Las Vegas. Nearly three years later, on January 22, 2020, the Raiders moved to Las Vegas.

The Raiders' on-field fortunes have varied considerably over the years. The team's first three years of operation (1960–1962) were marred by poor performance, financial difficulties, and spotty attendance. In 1963, the Raiders' fortunes improved dramatically with the introduction of head coach (and eventual owner) Al Davis. In 1967, after several years of improvement, the Raiders reached the postseason for the first time. The team would go on to win its first (and only) AFL Championship that year; in doing so, the Raiders advanced to Super Bowl II, where they were soundly defeated by the Green Bay Packers. Since 1963, the team has won 15 division titles (3 AFL and 12 NFL), 4 AFC Championships (1976, 1980, 1983, and 2002), one AFL Championship (1967), and three Super Bowl Championships: XI (1976), XV (1980), and XVIII (1983). As of the end of the NFL's 2020 season, the Raiders have an all-time regular season record of 481 wins, 440 losses, and 11 ties; their all-time playoff record currently stands at 25 wins and 19 losses.

Al Davis owned the team from 1972 until his death in 2011. Control of the franchise was then given to Al's son Mark Davis, with Al's wife Carol maintaining ownership. The Raiders are known for their extensive fan base and distinctive team culture. The Raiders have had 17 former players who have been enshrined in the Pro Football Hall of Fame as well as two former coaches and Al Davis. They have previously played at Kezar Stadium and Candlestick Park in San Francisco, Frank Youell Field and Oakland Coliseum in Oakland, and the Los Angeles Memorial Coliseum in Los Angeles.

Franchise history

First Oakland era (1960–1981) 
The Oakland Raiders were originally going to be called the "Oakland Señors" after a name-the-team contest had that name finish first, but after being the target of local jokes, the name was changed to the Raiders before the 1960 season began. Having enjoyed a successful collegiate coaching career as an assistant coach at Navy during the 1950s, San Francisco native Eddie Erdelatz was hired as the Raiders' first head coach. On February 9, 1960, after rejecting offers from the NFL's Washington Redskins and the AFL's Los Angeles Chargers, Erdelatz accepted the Raiders' head coaching position. In January 1960, the Raiders were established in Oakland, and, because of NFL interference with the original eighth franchise owner, were the last team of eight in the new American Football League to select players, thus relegated to the remaining talent available (see below).

The 1960 Raiders 42-man roster included 28 rookies and only 14 veterans. Among the Raiders rookies were future Pro Football Hall of Fame inductee center Jim Otto and future Raiders head coach, quarterback Tom Flores. In their debut year under Erdelatz, the Raiders finished with a 6–8 record.

On September 18, 1961, Erdelatz was dismissed after the Raiders were outscored 77–46 in the first two games of the season. On September 24, 1961, after the dismissal of Erdelatz, management named Los Angeles native and offensive line coach Marty Feldman as the Raiders head coach. The team finished the 1961 season with a 2–12 record.

Feldman began the 1962 season as Raiders head coach but was fired on October 16, 1962, after an 0–5 start. From October 16 through December, the Raiders were coached by Oklahoma native and former assistant coach Red Conkright. Under Conkright, the Raiders went 1–8, finishing the season with 1–13 record. Following the 1962 season the Raiders appointed Conkright to an interim mentor position as they looked for a new head coach.

After the 1962 season, Raiders managing general partner F. Wayne Valley hired Al Davis as Raiders head coach and general manager. At 33, he was the youngest person in professional football history to hold the positions. Davis immediately began to implement what he termed the "vertical game", an aggressive offensive strategy inspired by the offense developed by Chargers head coach Sid Gillman. Under Davis the Raiders improved to 10–4 and he was named the AFL's Coach of the Year in 1963. Though the team slipped to 5–7–2 in 1964, they rebounded to an 8–5–1 record in 1965. The famous silver and black Raider uniform debuted at the regular season-opening game on September 7, 1963. Prior to this, the team wore a combination of black and white with gold trim on the pants and oversized numerals.

In April 1966 Davis left the Raiders after being named AFL Commissioner, promoting assistant coach John Rauch to head coach. Two months later, the league announced its merger with the NFL. 

The leagues would retain separate regular seasons until 1970. With the merger, the position of commissioner was no longer needed, and Al Davis entered into discussions with Valley about returning to the Raiders. On July 25, 1966, Davis returned as part-owner of the team. He purchased a 10% interest in the team for $18,000, and became the team's third general partner. He also became head of football operations.

Under Rauch, the Raiders matched their 1965 season's 8–5–1 record in 1966 but missed the playoffs, finishing second in the AFL West Division.

AFL champions (1967) 
On the field, the team Davis had assembled steadily improved. Led by quarterback Daryle Lamonica, acquired in a trade with the Buffalo Bills, the Raiders finished the 1967 season with a 13–1 record and won the 1967 AFL Championship, defeating the Houston Oilers 40–7. The win earned the team a trip to the Orange Bowl in Miami, Florida to participate in Super Bowl II. On January 14, 1968, the Raiders were defeated in the second-ever Super Bowl, losing 33–14 to Vince Lombardi's Green Bay Packers.

The following year, the Raiders ended the 1968 season with a 12–2 record and again winning the AFL West Division title. They lost 27–23 to the New York Jets in the AFL Championship Game.

Citing management conflicts with day-to-day coaching decisions, Rauch resigned as Raiders head coach on January 16, 1969, accepting the head coaching job of the Buffalo Bills.

During the early 1960s, John Madden was a defensive assistant coach at San Diego State University under SDSU head coach Don Coryell. Madden credited Coryell as being an influence on his coaching. In 1967, Madden was hired by Al Davis as the Raiders linebacker coach. On February 4, 1969, after the departure of John Rauch, Madden was named the Raiders sixth head coach. Under Madden, the 1969 Raiders won the AFL West Division title for the third consecutive year with a 12–1–1 record. On December 20, 1969, the Raiders defeated the Oilers 56–7 in the AFL Division playoff game. In the AFL Championship game on January 4, 1970, the Raiders were defeated by Hank Stram's Kansas City Chiefs 17–7.

In 1970, the AFL–NFL merger was completed after four years and the Raiders joined the Western Division of the American Football Conference (actually the AFL West with the same teams as in 1969, except for the Cincinnati Bengals) in the newly merged NFL. The first post-merger season saw the Raiders win the AFC West with an 8–4–2 record and advance to the conference championship, where they lost to the Baltimore Colts. Despite another 8–4–2 season in 1971, it was only good for second place in the AFC West, and the team failed to make the playoffs. When backup offensive lineman Ron Mix played, the 1971 Raiders had an eventual all-Pro Football Hall of Fame offensive line with tackle Art Shell, guard Gene Upshaw, center Jim Otto, and tackle Bob Brown.

The teams of the 1970s were thoroughly dominant teams, with eight Hall of Fame inductees on the roster and a Hall of Fame coach in John Madden. The 1970s Raiders created the team's identity and persona as a team that was hard-hitting. Dominant on defense, with the crushing hits of safeties Jack Tatum and George Atkinson and cornerback Skip Thomas, the Raiders regularly held first place in the AFC West, entering the playoffs nearly every season. From 1973 through 1977, the Raiders reached the conference championship every year.

This was also the era of a bitter rivalry between the Pittsburgh Steelers and Raiders. In the 1970s, the Steelers and Raiders were frequently the two best teams in the AFC and, arguably, the NFL. The teams would meet on five occasions in the playoffs, and the winner of the Steelers-Raiders game went on to win the Super Bowl in three of those instances, from 1974 to 1976. The rivalry garnered attention in the sports media, with controversial plays, late hits, accusations and public statements.

The rivalry began with and was fueled by a controversial last-second play in their first playoff game in 1972. That season the Raiders achieved a 10–3–1 record and an AFC West title. In the divisional round, the Raiders would lose to the Steelers 13–7 on the controversial play that has become known as the "Immaculate Reception".

The Raiders and Steelers would meet again the following season as the Raiders won the AFC West again with a 9–4–1 record. Lamonica was replaced as starting quarterback early in the season by Ken Stabler. The Raiders defeated Pittsburgh 33–14 in the divisional round of the playoffs to reach the AFC Championship, but lost 27–10 to the Miami Dolphins.

In 1974 Oakland had a 12–2 regular season, which included a nine-game winning streak. They beat the Dolphins 28–26 in the divisional round of the playoffs in a see-saw battle remembered as the "Sea of Hands" game. They then lost the AFC Championship to the Steelers, who went on to win the Super Bowl. The Raiders were held to only 29 yards rushing by the Pittsburgh defense, and late mistakes turned a 10–3 lead at the start of the fourth quarter into a disappointing 24–13 loss.

In the 1975 season opener, the Raiders beat Miami and ended their 31-game home winning streak. With an 11–3 record, they defeated Cincinnati 31–28 in the divisional playoff round. Again, the Raiders faced the Steelers in the conference championship, eager for revenge. According to Madden and Davis, the Raiders relied on quick movement by their wide receivers on the outside sidelines – the deep threat, or 'long ball' – more so than the Steelers of that year, whose offense was far more run-oriented than it would become later in the 1970s. Forced to adapt to the frozen field of Three Rivers Stadium, with receivers slipping and unable to make quick moves to beat coverage, the Raiders lost, 16–10. The rivalry had now grown to hatred, and became the stereotype of the 'grudge match.' Again, the Raiders came up short, as the Steelers won the AFC Championship and then went on to another Super Bowl title.

Super Bowl XI champions (1976) 
In 1976, the Raiders came from behind dramatically to beat Pittsburgh 31–28 in the season opener and continued to cement its reputation for dirty play by knocking WR Lynn Swann out for two weeks with a clothesline to the helmet. Al Davis later tried to sue Steelers coach Chuck Noll for libel after the latter called safety George Atkinson a criminal for the hit. The Raiders won 13 regular-season games and a close controversial 21–17 victory over New England in the divisional playoffs. With the Patriots up by three points in the final two minutes, referee Ben Dreith called roughing the passer on New England's Ray "Sugar Bear" Hamilton after he hit Oakland QB Ken Stabler. The Raiders went on to score a touchdown in the final minute to win. They then defeated the Steelers 24–7 in the AFC Championship to advance to their second Super Bowl. In Super Bowl XI, Oakland's opponent was the Minnesota Vikings, a team that had lost three previous Super Bowls. The Raiders jumped out to an early lead and led 16–0 at halftime. By the end, having forced Minnesota into multiple turnovers, the Raiders won 32–14 for their first Super Bowl and post-merger championship.

The following season saw the Raiders finish 11–3, but they lost the division title to the Denver Broncos. They settled for a wild card, beating the Colts in the second-longest overtime game in NFL history and which featured the Ghost to the Post. The Raiders then fell to the Broncos in the AFC Championship.

During a 1978 preseason game, Patriots WR Darryl Stingley was injured by a hit from Raiders FS Jack Tatum and paralyzed for life. Although the 1978 Raiders achieved a winning record at 9–7, they missed the playoffs for the first time since 1971, losing critical games down the stretch to miss the playoffs.

After 10 consecutive winning seasons and one Super Bowl championship, John Madden left coaching in 1979 to pursue a career as a television football commentator. His replacement was former Raiders quarterback Tom Flores, the first Hispanic head coach in NFL history. Flores led the Raiders to another 9–7 season, but the team missed the playoffs.

Super Bowl XV champions (1980) 
In the midst of the turmoil of Al Davis' attempts to move the team to Los Angeles in 1980, Flores looked to lead the Raiders to their third Super Bowl by finishing the season 11–5 and earning a wild card berth. Quarterback Jim Plunkett revitalized his career, taking over in game five when starter Dan Pastorini was lost for the season to a broken leg after owner Al Davis had picked up Pastorini when he swapped quarterbacks with the Houston Oilers, sending the beloved Ken Stabler to the Oilers. The Raiders defeated Stabler and the Oilers in the Wild Card game and advanced to the AFC Championship by defeating the Cleveland Browns 14–12. The Raiders slipped by the AFC West champion San Diego Chargers to advance to their third Super Bowl. In Super Bowl XV, the Raiders faced head coach Dick Vermeil's Philadelphia Eagles. The Raiders dominated the Eagles, taking an early 14–0 lead in the first quarter behind two touchdown passes by Plunkett, including a then-Super Bowl record 80-yard pass and catch to running back Kenny King. A Cliff Branch third-quarter touchdown reception put the Raiders up 21–3 in the third quarter. They would go on to win 27–10, winning their second Super Bowl and becoming the first team to ever win the Super Bowl after getting into the playoffs as the wild card team.

The Raiders' final campaign of their first run in Oakland of 1981 saw the team fall to a 7–9 record, failing to make the playoffs following their Super Bowl win.

Los Angeles Raiders (1982–1994) 
In 1980 Al Davis attempted unsuccessfully to have improvements made to the Oakland–Alameda County Coliseum, specifically the addition of luxury boxes. That year, he signed a memorandum of agreement to move the Raiders from Oakland to Los Angeles. The move, which required three-fourths approval by league owners, was defeated 22–0 (with five owners abstaining). When Davis tried to move the team anyway, he was blocked by an injunction. In response, the Raiders not only became an active partner in an antitrust lawsuit filed by the Los Angeles Memorial Coliseum (who had recently lost the Los Angeles Rams to Anaheim), but filed an antitrust lawsuit of their own. After the first case was declared a mistrial, in May 1982, a second jury found in favor of Davis and the Los Angeles Coliseum, clearing the way for the move. With the ruling, the Raiders would relocate to Los Angeles for the 1982 season to play their home games at the Memorial Coliseum.

The newly minted Los Angeles Raiders finished the strike-shortened 1982 season 8–1 to win the AFC West, but lost in the second round of the playoffs to the Jets.

Super Bowl XVIII champions (1983) 
The following season, the Raiders finished 12–4 to win the AFC West. Convincing playoff wins over the Steelers and Seattle Seahawks in the AFC playoffs propelled the Raiders to their fourth Super Bowl. Against the Washington Redskins in Super Bowl XVIII, the Raiders built a lead after blocking a punt and recovering for a touchdown early in the game. A Branch touchdown reception from Plunkett put the Raiders up 14–0 with more than nine minutes remaining in the first quarter. With seven seconds remaining in the first half, linebacker Jack Squirek intercepted a Joe Theismann swing pass at the Washington five-yard line and scored, sending the Raiders to a 21–3 halftime lead. Following a John Riggins one-yard touchdown run (extra point was blocked), Marcus Allen scored from five yards out to build the lead to 28–9. The Raiders sealed the game with Allen reversed his route on a Super Bowl record run that turned into a 74-yard touchdown. The Raiders went on to a 38–9 victory and their third NFL championship. Allen set a record for most rushing yards (191) and combined yards (209) in a Super Bowl as the Raiders won their third Super Bowl in eight years.

The team had another successful regular season in 1984, finishing 11–5, but a three-game losing streak forced them to enter the playoffs as a wild-card, where they fell to the Seahawks in the Wild Card game.

The 1985 Raiders campaign saw 12 wins and a division title as Marcus Allen was named MVP. A loss to the Patriots derailed any further postseason hopes.

The Raiders' fortunes declined after that, and from 1986 to 1989, they finished no better than 8–8 and posted consecutive losing seasons for the first time since 1961–62. Also in 1986, Al Davis got into a widely publicized argument with Marcus Allen, whom he accused of faking injuries. The feud continued into 1987, and Davis retaliated by signing Bo Jackson to essentially replace Allen. Jackson was also a left fielder for Major League Baseball's Kansas City Royals, and could not play full-time until baseball season ended in October. Even worse, another strike cost the NFL one game and prompted them to use substitute players. The Raiders achieved a 1–2 record before the regular players returned after the strike. After a weak 5–10 finish, Tom Flores moved to the front office and was replaced by Denver Broncos offensive assistant coach Mike Shanahan.

Shanahan led the team to a 7–9 season in 1988, and Allen and Jackson continued to trade places as the starting running back. Low game attendance and fan apathy were evident by this point, and in the summer of 1988, rumors of a Raiders return to Oakland intensified when a preseason game against the Houston Oilers was scheduled at Oakland–Alameda County Coliseum.

After starting the 1989 season with a 1–3 record, Shanahan was fired by Davis, which began a long-standing feud between the two. He was replaced by former Raider offensive lineman Art Shell, who had been voted into the Pro Football Hall of Fame earlier in the year. With the hiring, Shell became the first African American head coach in the modern NFL era, but the team still finished a middling 8–8.

In 1990 Shell led the Raiders to a 12–4 record. Behind Bo Jackson's spectacular play, they beat the Cincinnati Bengals in the divisional round of the playoffs. Jackson suffered a severe hip and leg injury after a tackle during the game. Without him, the Raiders were blown out 51–3 in the AFC Championship by the Buffalo Bills. Jackson was forced to quit football as a result of the injury, although surgery allowed him to continue playing baseball until he retired in 1994.

The Raiders finished with a 9–7 record in 1991, but struggled looking for a reliable quarterback and lost to the Kansas City Chiefs in the Wild Card game. The struggle for a quarterback continued in 1992 as the Raiders started two different quarterbacks and stumbled to a 7–9 record, two other playoff appearances during the 1990s, and finished higher than third place only three times.

The Raiders rebounded well in 1993 with Jeff Hostetler as the everyday quarterback, finishing in second place in the AFC West with a 10–6 record. A win over the Broncos in the wild card game means a rematch against the Bills for the right to go to the AFC Championship game. The Raiders, led by two Napoleon McCallum rushing touchdowns took a halftime lead, but could only manage six points in the second half losing to the Bills again 29–23.

Following a 9–7 record in the 1994 season that resulted in the team missing the playoffs, Art Shell was fired.

Second Oakland era (1995–2019) 
As early as 1986, Davis sought to abandon the Coliseum in favor of a more modern stadium. In addition to sharing the venue with the USC Trojans, the Raiders were less than ecstatic with the Coliseum as it was aging and still lacked the luxury suites and other amenities that Davis was promised when he moved the Raiders to Los Angeles. Finally, the Coliseum had 95,000 seats and the Raiders were rarely able to fill all of them even in their best years, and so most Raiders home games were blacked out in Southern California. Numerous sites in California were considered, including one near the now-defunct Hollywood Park in Inglewood, where SoFi Stadium for the Rams and Chargers now stands, and another in Carson. In August 1987 it was announced that the city of Irwindale paid Davis US$10 million as a good-faith deposit for a prospective stadium site. When the bid failed, Davis kept the non-refundable deposit. During this time Davis also almost moved the team to Sacramento in a deal that would have included Davis becoming the managing partner of the Sacramento Kings.

Negotiations between Davis and Oakland commenced in January 1989, and on March 11, 1990, Davis announced his intention to bring the Raiders back to Oakland. By September 1990, numerous delays had prevented the completion of the deal between Davis and Oakland. On September 11, Davis announced a new deal to stay in Los Angeles, leading many fans in Oakland to burn Raiders paraphernalia in disgust.

On June 23, 1995, Davis signed a letter of intent to move the Raiders back to Oakland. The move was approved by the Alameda County Board of Supervisors the next month. As the NFL had never recognized the Raiders' initial move to Los Angeles, they could not disapprove of the move or request a relocation fee, which had to be paid by the Los Angeles Rams for their move to St. Louis. In order to convince Davis to return, Oakland spent $220 million on stadium renovations. These included a new seating section – commonly known as "Mount Davis" – with 10,000 seats. It also built the team a training facility and paid all its moving costs. The Raiders paid $525,000 a year in rent – a fraction of what the nearby San Francisco 49ers paid to play at the now-extinct Candlestick Park – and did not pay maintenance or game-day operating costs.

The move was greeted with much fanfare, and under new head coach Mike White the 1995 season began well for the Raiders. Oakland started 8–2, but injuries to starting quarterback Jeff Hostetler contributed to a six-game losing streak for an 8–8 finish and the Raiders failed to qualify for the playoffs for a second consecutive season.

After two more losing seasons (7–9 in 1996 and 4–12 in 1997) under White and his successor, Joe Bugel, Davis selected a new head coach from outside the Raiders organization for only the second time when he hired Philadelphia Eagles offensive coordinator Jon Gruden. Gruden previously worked for the 49ers and Green Bay Packers under head coach Mike Holmgren. Under Gruden, the Raiders posted consecutive 8–8 seasons in 1998 and 1999.

Oakland finished 12–4 in the 2000 season, the team's most successful in a decade. Led by veteran quarterback Rich Gannon (MVP), Oakland won their first division title since 1990, and advanced to the AFC Championship, where Gannon was hurt when sacked by Baltimore Ravens' lineman Tony Siragusa. The Raider offense struggled without Gannon, and the Raiders fell 16–3 to the eventual Super Bowl champion Ravens.

The Raiders acquired all-time leading receiver Jerry Rice prior to the 2001 season. They started 10–3 but lost their last three games and finished with a 10–6 record and a wild card playoff spot. They defeated the New York Jets 38–24 in the wild card round to advance to face the New England Patriots. In a game in which the Raiders led for most of the game, the game was played in a heavy snowstorm. In what would be known as the "Tuck Rule Game", late in the fourth quarter with the Patriots trailing the Raiders by a field goal, Raiders star cornerback Charles Woodson blitzed Patriots quarterback Tom Brady, causing an apparent fumble which was recovered by Raiders linebacker Greg Biekert. The recovery would assuredly have led to a Raiders victory, as the Raiders would have a first down with 1:43 remaining and the Patriots had no more time outs); the play was reviewed and determined to be an incomplete pass (it was ruled that Brady had pump-faked and then had not yet "tucked" the ball into his body, which, by rule, cannot result in a fumble, was instead an incomplete pass—though this explanation was not given on the field, but after the NFL season had ended). The Patriots retained possession and drove for a game-tying field goal. The game went into overtime and the Patriots won 16–13.

On February 18, 2002, the Raiders made a move that involved releasing Gruden from his contract and allowing the Tampa Bay Buccaneers to sign him. In return, the Raiders received $8 million and four future draft picks from the Buccaneers (Davis was later quoted as stating that he did not regret the move at all). Bill Callahan, who served as the team's offensive coordinator and offensive line coach during Gruden's tenure, was named head coach.

Under Callahan, the Raiders finished the 2002 season 11–5, won their third-straight division title, and clinched the top seed in the playoffs. Rich Gannon was named MVP of the NFL after passing for a league-high 4,689 yards. After beating the Jets and Titans by large margins in the playoffs, the Raiders made their fifth Super Bowl appearance in Super Bowl XXXVII. Their opponent was the Tampa Bay Buccaneers, coached by Gruden. The Raiders, who had not made significant changes to Gruden's offensive schemes, were intercepted five times by the Buccaneers en route to a 48–21 blowout. Some Tampa Bay players claimed that Gruden had given them so much information on Oakland's offense, they knew exactly what plays were being called.

Callahan's second season as head coach was considerably less successful. Oakland finished 4–12, which was their worst showing since 1997. After a late-season loss to the Denver Broncos, a visibly frustrated Callahan exclaimed, "We've got to be the dumbest team in America in terms of playing the game." At the end of the 2003 regular season Callahan was fired and replaced by former Washington Redskins head coach Norv Turner.

The team's fortunes did not improve in Turner's first year. Oakland finished the 2004 season 5–11, with only one divisional win (a one-point victory over the Broncos in Denver). During a Week 3 victory against the Buccaneers, Rich Gannon suffered a neck injury that ended his season and eventually his career. He never returned to the team and retired before the 2005 season. Kerry Collins, who led the New York Giants to an appearance in Super Bowl XXXV and signed with Oakland after the 2003 season, became the team's starting quarterback.

In an effort to bolster their offense, in early 2005 the Raiders acquired Pro Bowl wide receiver Randy Moss via trade with the Minnesota Vikings, and signed free agent running back Lamont Jordan of the New York Jets. After a 4–12 season and a second consecutive last-place finish, Turner was fired as head coach.

On February 11, 2006, the team announced the return of Art Shell as head coach. In announcing the move, Al Davis said that firing Shell in 1995 had been a mistake.
Under Shell, the Raiders lost their first five games in 2006 en route to a 2–14 record, the team's worst since 1962. Despite having one of the best defenses, Oakland's offense struggled greatly, scoring just 168 points (fewest in franchise history) and allowing a league-high 72 sacks. Wide receiver Jerry Porter was benched by Shell for most of the season in what many viewed as a personal, rather than football-related, decision. Shell was fired again at the end of the season. The Raiders also earned the right to the first overall pick in the 2007 NFL Draft for the first time since 1962, by virtue of having the league's worst record.

On January 22, 2007, the team announced the hiring of 31-year-old USC offensive coordinator Lane Kiffin, the youngest coach in franchise history and the youngest coach in the NFL. In the 2007 NFL Draft, the Raiders selected LSU quarterback JaMarcus Russell with the No. 1 overall pick, despite a strong objection from Kiffin. Russell, arguably the biggest bust in NFL history, held out until September 12 and did not make his first career start until week 17. Kiffin coached the Raiders to a 4–12 record in the 2007 season. After a 1–3 start to 2008 and months of speculation and rumors, Davis fired Kiffin on September 30.

Tom Cable was named as Kiffin's interim replacement, and subsequently signed as the 17th head coach of the Raiders on February 3, 2009.

The team's finish to the 2008 season would turn out to match their best since they lost the Super Bowl in the 2002 season. They still finished 5–11 and ended up third in the AFC West, the first time they did not finish last since 2002. They would produce an identical record in 2009; the season was somewhat ameliorated by the fact that four of the Raiders' five wins were against opponents with above .500 records. In 2010 the Raiders became the first team in NFL history to go undefeated against their division yet miss the playoffs (6–0 in the AFC West, 8–8 overall, 3 games behind the Jets for the second Wild Card entry). On January 4, 2011, owner Al Davis informed head coach Tom Cable that his contract would not be renewed, ending his tenure with the organization. Many Raider players, such as punter Shane Lechler, were upset with the decision.

On January 17, 2011, it was announced that offensive coordinator Hue Jackson was going to be the next Raiders head coach. A press conference was held on January 18, 2011, to formally introduce Jackson as the next Raiders head coach, the fifth in just seven years. Following Davis's death during the 2011 season, new owners Carol and Mark Davis decided to take the franchise in a drastically different direction by hiring a general manager. On New Year's Day of 2012, the Raiders played the San Diego Chargers, hoping to go to the playoffs for the first time since 2002, the game ended with a 38–26 loss. Their season ended with another disappointing 8–8 record.

The Raiders named Green Bay Packers director of football operations Reggie McKenzie as the team's first general manager since Al Davis on January 6, 2012.

On January 24, 2012, McKenzie hired Dennis Allen as the team's 18th head coach.  He was the first Raiders defense-oriented head coach since John Madden's retirement after the 1978 season.

The Raiders began 2012 by running a nose tackle when they run a 4-3 defense. They lost their home opener on Monday Night Football against San Diego 22–14, and finished the season 4–12.

In the 2013 off-season, the Raiders began making major roster moves. These included the signing of linebackers Kevin Burnett, Nick Roach, and Kaluka Maiava, defensive tackles Pat Sims and Vance Walker, cornerbacks Tracy Porter and Mike Jenkins, defensive end Jason Hunter, and safety Usama Young and the release of wide receiver Darrius Heyward-Bey, safety Michael Huff, linebacker Rolando McClain and defensive tackle Tommy Kelly. Starting quarterback Carson Palmer was traded to the Arizona Cardinals in exchange for a sixth-round draft pick and a conditional seventh-round draft pick. Shortly before, they had traded a fifth-round pick and an undisclosed conditional pick in exchange for Matt Flynn. In addition to signing Matt Flynn, the Raiders also welcomed back Charles Woodson, signing him to a 1-year deal in mid-May. The Raiders finished the 2013 season with a record of 4–12.

In the 2014 NFL Draft, the Raiders selected linebacker Khalil Mack in the first round and quarterback Derek Carr in the second round hoping each would anchor their side of the ball. Carr was given control early as he was chosen as the starter for the opener of the 2014 season. After an 0–4 start to the 2014 season, and an 8–28 overall record as head coach, Allen was fired. Offensive line coach Tony Sparano was named interim head coach on September 30. The Raiders finished the 2014 season with a record of 3–13. Carr started all 16 games for the Raiders, the first Raider since 2002 to do so. First-round pick Mack finished third in Defensive Rookie of the Year voting.

Jack Del Rio was hired to become the new head coach of the Raiders on January 14, 2015, replacing the fired Dennis Allen (who coincidentally had preceded him as the Broncos defensive coordinator) and interim head coach Tony Sparano.

The Raiders showed great improvement in Del Rio's first season, improving upon their three-win 2014 season, going 7–9 in the 2015 season. Rookie wide receiver Amari Cooper fulfilled almost all expectations and Derek Carr continued his improvement at quarterback. Cooper, Mack, Murray, and Carr were selected to participate in the Pro Bowl. DE Khalil Mack was the first player ever to be selected as an AP 2015 All-Pro Team at two positions in the same year.

The day following the conclusion of the 2015 regular season, the Raiders, St. Louis Rams, and San Diego Chargers all filed to relocate to Los Angeles. On January 12, 2016, the NFL owners voted 30–2 to allow the Rams to return to L.A. and approved a stadium project in Inglewood proposed by Rams owner Stan Kroenke over a competing project in Carson that the Chargers and Raiders had jointly proposed. The Chargers were given a one-year approval to relocate as well, conditioned on negotiating a lease agreement with the Rams or an agreement to partner with the Rams on the new stadium construction. The Raiders were given conditional permission to relocate if the Chargers were to decline their option first.

As part of the Rams' relocation decision, the NFL offered to provide both the Chargers and Raiders $100 million each if they could work out new stadiums in their home markets. The Chargers eventually announced on January 12, 2017, that they would exercise their option to relocate to Los Angeles following the failure of a November 2016 ballot initiative to fund a new stadium in San Diego. In an official statement on the Rams decision, the Raiders offered they would "now turn our attention to exploring all options to find a permanent stadium solution." Las Vegas and San Antonio were heavily rumored as possible relocation destinations. By mid-February 2016, the team had worked out a one-year lease agreement with the City of Oakland to play at O.co Coliseum with the option for a second one-year lease.

In late January 2016 billionaire Sheldon Adelson, president and CEO of the Las Vegas Sands Corporation casino empire, proposed a new domed stadium in Las Vegas to potentially house the University of Nevada, Las Vegas football team and a possible NFL team. Adelson quickly reached out to the Raiders to discuss the team partnering on the new stadium. In April 2016, without promising the team would move, Raiders owner Mark Davis met with the Southern Nevada Tourism Infrastructure Committee and pledged $500 million toward Adelson's stadium if public officials agreed to contribute to the stadium.

A group of investors led by former NFL stars Ronnie Lott and Rodney Peete proposed a new stadium to the city of Oakland in June 2016 as a way to keep the Raiders in the city.

Nevada's legislature approved a $750 million public subsidy for the proposed domed Las Vegas stadium in October 2016. Davis informed his fellow NFL owners that he intended to file for relocation to Las Vegas following the end of the season.

On November 28, 2016, the Raiders secured their first winning season since 2002 with a comeback win against the Carolina Panthers, and on December 18, the team clinched their first postseason berth since 2002 with a victory over the San Diego Chargers. On December 20, 2016, the NFL announced that the Raiders would have seven Pro Bowl selections: Khalil Mack, Derek Carr, Amari Cooper, Donald Penn, Kelechi Osemele, Rodney Hudson and Reggie Nelson. This was the most selections for the team since 1991, and the most for any team in the 2016 NFL season.

As the fifth seed in the AFC in the 2016 NFL playoffs, the Raiders faced the Houston Texans in the opening Wild Card round. With significant injuries hampering the team, including the loss of starting quarterback Carr in the second to last regular-season game, they lost to the Texans 27–14.

The Raiders filed paperwork with the NFL on January 19, 2017, to relocate the club from Oakland to Las Vegas, Nevada by the 2020 season. The vote for the team's relocation took place on March 27, 2017, and the NFL approved the Raiders' relocation to Las Vegas by a 31–1 vote. Only the Miami Dolphins dissented the proposed move. Subsequently, the team announced that it would continue to be known as the Oakland Raiders for the 2017 and 2018 NFL seasons and play its games in Oakland for at least those two seasons.

Prior to the 2017 season, the Raiders signed quarterback Derek Carr to a then-NFL record contract extension of five years, $125 million. Following their first trip to the playoffs in 14 years, the Raiders expected bigger things in 2017, with a return to the playoffs seeming likely. The Raider defense struggled mightily on the year under Ken Norton Jr., but later improved with John Pagano as the defensive coordinator and the Raider offense could not return to its previous year's form under first-year offensive coordinator Todd Downing. After winning the first two games of the season, the Raiders lost four straight and six of their next eight leaving them two games below .500 with six games remaining. They would win their next two games, but lose their final four games, ending the season a disappointing 6–10. On December 31, 2017, following a loss to the Los Angeles Chargers in Week 17, head coach Del Rio was fired by Mark Davis after being granted a four-year contract extension prior to the season.

On January 6, 2018, the team announced the return of Jon Gruden as head coach. Gruden returned to the Raiders and coaching after a nine-year stint with ESPN serving as analyst for Monday Night Football. Davis, who had reportedly been wanting to hire Gruden for six years, gave Gruden a 10-year contract worth an estimated $100 million. One of the first major moves of the second Gruden era was a blockbuster trade that sent Khalil Mack who was holding out for a new contract to the Chicago Bears for two first-round draft picks, and later sent Amari Cooper to the Dallas Cowboys for another first-round draft pick. During the 2018 season the Raiders fired general manager Reggie McKenzie, replacing him with NFL Network's draft expert Mike Mayock for the 2019 season. The Raiders finished 4–12 and in last place in the AFC West for the first time since 2014. The next year, in what would be the last season of the team's second tenure in Oakland, the team posted a three-game turnaround with a 7–9 record.

Las Vegas Raiders (2020–present) 

On January 22, 2020, it was announced that the Raiders had relocated to Las Vegas. The Raiders played the 2020 season without fans in attendance for home games due to the ongoing COVID-19 pandemic. They started the season 6–3, but lost five of their last seven games to finish the season 8–8 and miss the playoffs for the fourth consecutive season.

A league investigation in 2021 revealed that Gruden had used racist, misogynistic, and homophobic language in emails in 2011 while working for ESPN. The emails referred to NFL commissioner Roger Goodell as a "faggot" and a "clueless anti football pussy." He also said Goodell should not have pressured the Rams to draft "queers," referring to Michael Sam, the first openly gay player drafted in NFL history. He also stated that players who protest the National Anthem should be "fired," specifically referring to former 49ers safety Eric Reid. Gruden also called then United States Vice President Joe Biden a "nervous clueless pussy." He resigned on October 11, 2021, after more details of the emails were released by The New York Times. Special Teams Coordinator, Rich Bisaccia, was named the interim head coach of the Raiders following Gruden's resignation. Shortly after the resignation, owner Mark Davis refused to comment on the controversy.

On November 2, 2021, starting wide receiver Henry Ruggs was arrested and charged with multiple felonies after killing a woman in a car crash. Later that day, the Raiders released Ruggs. On November 8, cornerback Damon Arnette was released after a video surfaced of him brandishing firearms.

On January 30, 2022, the Raiders announced the hiring of Dave Ziegler as general manager. Ziegler was previously the director of player personnel for the New England Patriots and served in the Patriots scouting department from 2013 to 2021. On January 31, 2022, the Raiders announced the hiring of Josh McDaniels as head coach. On February 4, 2022, the Raiders announced the hiring of Patrick Graham as defensive coordinator.

Championships

AFL championships
The Raiders finished the 1967 season with a 13–1–0 record and won the 1967 AFL Championship. They subsequently lost to the Green Bay Packers in Super Bowl II.

Super Bowl championships
The Raiders have won a total of three Super Bowl championships. They won their first Super Bowl under head coach John Madden, and their next two with Tom Flores.

AFC championships

Division championships

Logos and uniforms

When the team was founded in 1960, the Oakland Tribune held a name-the-team contest. The winning name was the Oakland Señors. After a few days of being the butt of local jokes (and accusations that the contest was fixed, as Chet Soda was fairly well known within the Oakland business community for calling his acquaintances "señor"), the fledgling team (and its owners) changed the team's name nine days later to the Oakland Raiders, which had finished third in the naming contest. Chet Soda hired a well-known sportswriter, Gene Lawrence Perry, as the first Director of Public Relations. Perry (who was hired in 1959 as the first front-office hire) commissioned an unknown Berkeley artist and asked that a logo be created which included a helmeted man with an eye-patch, with the firm chin of a Randolph Scott, a well known Western film actor. The new owners had their newly minted Raiders logo, a pirate wearing a football helmet with an eye patch on a gold football background with two white swords in black trim with gold handles crossed behind the football.

The original Raiders uniforms were black and gold with Gothic numerals, while the helmets were black with a white stripe and no logo. The team wore this design from 1960 to 1962. In a very rare move, the jerseys displayed the player's full name on the back, before being pared down to only the surname in 1963. When Al Davis became head coach and general manager in 1963, he changed the team's color scheme to silver and black, and added a logo to the helmet. This logo is a shield that consists of the word "RAIDERS" at the top, two crossed cutlasses with handles up and cutting edge down, and superimposed head of a Raider wearing a football helmet and a black eye patch covering his right eye. Over the years, it has undergone minor color modifications (such as changing the background from silver to black in 1964), but it has essentially remained the same.

The Raiders' current silver and black uniform design has essentially remained the same since it debuted in 1963. It consists of silver helmets, silver pants, and either black or white jerseys. The black jerseys have silver lettering names and numbers, while the white jerseys have black lettering names and numbers with silver outlining the numbers only. Originally, the white jerseys had black letters for the names and silver numbers with a thick black outline, but they were changed to black with a silver outline for the 1964 season. In 1970, the team used silver numerals with black outline and black lettering names for the season. In 1971, the team again displayed black numerals and have stayed that way ever since (with the exception of the 1994 season as part of the NFL's 75th Anniversary where they donned the 1963 helmets with the 1970 silver away numbers and black lettering names).

The Raiders wore their white jerseys at home for the first time in their history on September 28, 2008, against the San Diego Chargers. The decision was made by Lane Kiffin, who was coaching his final game for the Raiders, and was purportedly due to intense heat. The high temperature in Oakland that day was 78°.

For the 2009 season, the Raiders took part in the AFL Legacy Program and wore 1960s throwback jerseys for games against other teams from the former AFL.

In the 2012 and 2013 seasons, the team wore black cleats as a tribute to Al Davis. The team reverted to white cleats in 2014, though in recent years the NFL relaxed its rules on primary cleat colors, allowing some players to wear black or gray/silver cleats.

In the 2016 season, the Raiders brought back their classic white jerseys with silver numerals as part of the NFL Color Rush initiative. Unlike the regular uniforms which are paired with silver pants and black/white socks, the Color Rush jerseys were paired with white pants with silver stripes and all-white socks. Starting in 2018, the Raiders retired the white pants but kept the throwback white jerseys, wearing them along with silver pants and black socks in a style reminiscent of the 1970 road set.

No changes to uniforms or logos were made during the team's move to Las Vegas, aside from changing "OAKLAND" to "LAS VEGAS" on various wordmark logos.

Home fields

After splitting the first home season between Kezar Stadium and Candlestick, the Raiders moved exclusively to Candlestick Park in 1961, where total attendance for the season was about 50,000, and finished 2–12. Valley threatened to move the Raiders out of the area unless a stadium was built in Oakland, so in 1962 the Raiders moved into 18,000-seat Frank Youell Field (later expanded to 22,000 seats), their first home in Oakland. It was a temporary home for the team while the 53,000 seat Oakland Coliseum was under construction; the Coliseum was completed in 1966. The Raiders shared the Coliseum with the Oakland Athletics once the A's moved to Oakland from Kansas City in 1968, except for the years the Raiders called Los Angeles home (1982–94). The Raiders defeated and lost to all 31 other NFL teams at the Coliseum at least once.

The Raiders did play one regular-season game at California Memorial Stadium in Berkeley. On September 23, 1973, they played the Miami Dolphins in Berkeley due to a scheduling conflict with the Athletics. The team defeated the Dolphins 12–7, ending Miami's winning streak.

During the Los Angeles years, the Raiders played in the 93,000-seat Los Angeles Memorial Coliseum.

From the assumption of the team by Mark Davis in 2011, the Raiders had been subject to rampant relocation speculation as the team attempted to find a new stadium in Oakland or elsewhere, due to the age of Oakland Alameda Coliseum, being secondary tenants to Major League Baseball's Athletics, and the expiration of the team's lease at the end of 2013. After looking into a variety of options in the Bay Area, Los Angeles and elsewhere the team ultimately relocated to the Las Vegas area in 2020 where Allegiant Stadium was finishing construction. The Raiders share the 65,000-seat stadium with the UNLV Rebels football program.

Culture

Slogans
Al Davis coined slogans such as "Pride and Poise", "Commitment to Excellence", and "Just Win, Baby"—all of which are registered trademarks of the team.
"Commitment to Excellence" comes from a quote from Vince Lombardi, "The quality of a person's life is in direct proportion to their commitment to excellence, regardless of their chosen field of endeavor."

Raider Nation

The nickname Raider Nation refers to the fans of the team spread throughout the United States and the world. Members of the Raider Nation who attend home games are known for arriving to the stadium early, tailgating, and dressing up in face masks and black outfits. The Raider Nation is also known for the Black Hole, originally a specific area of the Coliseum (sections 104–107) frequented by the team's rowdiest and most fervent fans from 1995 until 2019.

Al Davis created the phrase Raider Nation in 1968. In September 2009, Ice Cube recorded a song for the Raiders named "Raider Nation". In 2010, Davis took part in a documentary for ESPN's 30 for 30 series titled Straight Outta L.A.. It mainly focuses on N.W.A and the effect of the Raiders' image on their persona. In 2012, Ice Cube wrote another song for the Raiders as part of Pepsi's NFL Anthems campaign, "Come and Get It". It was released on September 14, 2012.

Cheerleaders

The Las Vegas Raiderettes are the cheerleading squad for the Las Vegas Raiders. They were established in 1961 as the Oakland Raiderettes. During the team's time in Los Angeles they were the Los Angeles Raiderettes. They have been billed as "Football's Fabulous Females".

Radio and television

Las Vegas Raiders Radio Network

Raider games are broadcast in English on 36 radio stations across the western United States, including flagship stations KOMP 92.3 FM The Rock Station and KRLV Raider Nation Radio 920AM in Las Vegas. Games are broadcast on radio stations in Nevada, California, Oregon, Colorado, Hawaii, and Arkansas. Jason Horowitz is the play-by-play announcer, along with former Raiders tackle Lincoln Kennedy doing commentary. George Atkinson and Jim Plunkett offer pre- and post-game commentary. Compass Media Networks is responsible for producing and distributing Raiders radio broadcasts. Raider games are broadcast in Spanish on 8 radio stations across Nevada and California, including flagship Spanish language station KENO 1460 Deportes Vegas in Las Vegas. Cristian Echeverria is the Spanish-language play-by-play announcer with Harry Ruiz doing commentary.

Bill King was the voice of the Raiders from 1966 to 1992, during which time he called approximately 600 games. The Raiders awarded him rings for all three of their Super Bowl victories. It is King's radio audio heard on most of the NFL Films highlight footage of the Raiders. King's call of the Holy Roller has been labeled (by Chris Berman, among others) as one of the five best in NFL history. King died in October 2005 from complications after surgery. Former San Francisco 49ers tight end Monty Stickles and Scotty Stirling, an Oakland Tribune sportswriter, served as color commentators with King. The Raider games were called on radio from 1960 to 1962 by Bud (Wilson Keene) Foster and Mel Venter, and from 1963 to 1965 by Bob Blum and Dan Galvin. Until their dismissal prior to the 2018 season, Greg Papa was the voice of the Raiders with former Raiders quarterback and coach Tom Flores doing commentary from 1997 to 2017. From 2018 until 2022 Brent Musburger was the voice of the Raiders.

In June 2017, it was announced that Beasley Media Group signed a two-year deal as the Las Vegas flagship radio partner of the Raiders. Beasley's stations KCYE (102.7) "The Coyote" and KDWN (720) began carrying all preseason and regular season games in the 2017 season. Beginning with the 2019 season, the Raiders' Las Vegas flagship station became "93.1 The Mountain" KYMT. In 2020, a deal was signed with Lotus Broadcasting to make KOMP the Raiders flagship station and re-brand KBAD to KRLV Raider Nation Radio.

Television
The Raiders' games are broadcast in Las Vegas on CBS affiliate KLAS-TV (channel 8) and in the Bay Area on CBS owned-and-operated station KPIX-TV (channel 5) (when playing an AFC opponent) and on Las Vegas Fox affiliate KVVU-TV (channel 5) and in the Bay Area on Fox owned-and-operated station KTVU (channel 2) (when hosting an NFC opponent), unless there is an NFL blackout locally. Sunday night games are on Las Vegas NBC affiliate KSNV (channel 3) and in the Bay Area on NBC owned-and-operated station KNTV (channel 11). In 2018, Thursday games moved to KTVU and KVVU-TV in Oakland and Las Vegas, respectively, formerly airing on either NBC or CBS prior to 2018. All Thursday games air on NFL Network otherwise. Traditionally, Monday night games airing on ESPN would air on ABC affiliates KTNV-TV (channel 13) in Las Vegas and KGO-TV (channel 7) in Oakland.

During the team's two tenures in Oakland, the Raiders were a beneficiary of league scheduling policies. Both the Raiders and the San Francisco 49ers shared the San Francisco Bay Area market, on the West Coast of the United States. This meant that the Raiders could not play any home games, road division games against the Denver Broncos or Los Angeles Chargers, or interconference road games against the NFC West (in seasons that the AFC West and NFC West meet in interconference play) in the early 10:00 a.m. Pacific time slot. In addition, they could not play interconference home games at the same time or network as the 49ers. As a result, both teams generally had more limited scheduling options and also benefited by receiving more prime time games than usual.

Starting shortly after the announcement of the Raider franchise relocation to Las Vegas, KVVU-TV, the local Fox affiliate in Las Vegas began carrying all Raiders preseason games and special content. In 2020, a deal was made with Nexstar Media Group for stations in Raiders markets placing Raiders preseason and special content on KRON-TV (moving from KTVU) in the Bay Area, KTLA in Los Angeles, KTVX in Salt Lake City, KHON-TV in Honolulu, and  KGET-TV in Bakersfield alongside KVVU and KLAS in Las Vegas.

Rivals
The Raiders have rivalries with the other three teams in the AFC West (Denver Broncos, Kansas City Chiefs, and Los Angeles Chargers) and a geographic rivalry with the San Francisco 49ers. They also have rivalries with other teams that arose from playoff battles in the past, most notably with the Pittsburgh Steelers and the New England Patriots. The Seattle Seahawks have an old rivalry with Oakland/Los Angeles/Las Vegas as well, but the rivalry largely died down when the Seahawks moved to the NFC West as part of the NFL's 2002 realignment.

Divisional rivals
Kansas City Chiefs

The Chiefs are one of the Raiders' most iconic and longstanding divisional foes, with the rivalry dating back to the earliest days of the AFL. Oakland lost the 1969 AFL Championship against Kansas City, who went on to beat the Minnesota Vikings and win the Super Bowl. From 1990 to 1999, the Raiders have lost 17 out of 20 regular-season meetings between the Chiefs, including a 10–game losing streak at Kansas City; the Raiders also lost to the Chiefs 10–6 in the Wild Card round on December 28, 1991. On September 8, 1996, the Chiefs also began to lead the overall series against the Raiders for the first time since November 23, 1969. On January 1, 2000, the last game of the 1999 NFL regular season, the Raiders defeated the Chiefs for the first time in Kansas City since 1988 in overtime on a 33-yard field goal kick made by Joe Nedney. The Chiefs lead the overall series 71–54–2, and are the only team in the AFC West that the Raiders have a losing record against. Las Vegas currently have defeated Kansas City just three times since the 2012 NFL season. Until October 19, 2017 - when they defeated the Chiefs, 31–30 on a game-tying touchdown on the last play of the game, leading to a game-winning PAT - the Raiders had lost five straight to the Chiefs, their previous win against them being in the 2014 season.

Denver Broncos

The Raiders' rivalry with the Broncos, is considered to be one of the most heated and well-known rivalries in NFL history. The Raiders managed a 14-game winning streak against the Broncos from 1965 to 1971, which lasted until October 22, 1972, when the Broncos defeated the Raiders 30–23. While the Raiders still hold the advantage in the all-time series 70–54–2, the Broncos amassed 21 wins in 28 games, from the 1995 season and the arrival of Broncos head coach Mike Shanahan, through the 2008 season. Shanahan coached the Raiders before being fired just four games into the 1989 season, which has only served to intensify this rivalry. On October 24, 2010, the Raiders beat the Broncos (59–14), giving the Raiders the most points scored in a game in the team's history. On December 13, 2015, the Raiders pulled a huge upset on the Broncos (15–12) by a spectacular performance from their defense allowing 4 field goals. Linebacker Khalil Mack who recorded 5 sacks in that game against Denver which is tied the most sacks in franchise along with Howie Long. The Broncos reached their first-ever Super Bowl when they defeated the Raiders 20–17 in the AFC Championship Game. The two teams have faced off on Monday Night Football a total of 19 times, making it the most frequent Monday Night matchup in NFL history.

Los Angeles Chargers

The Los Angeles Chargers' rivalry with Oakland dates to the 1963 season, when the Raiders defeated the heavily favored Chargers twice, both come-from-behind fourth-quarter victories. The Raiders held a streak without losing to the Chargers with a 16–0–2 record from 1968 to 1977. One of the most memorable games between these teams was the "Holy Roller" game in 1978, in which the Raiders fumbled for a touchdown in a very controversial play. In January 1981 the Chargers hosted their first AFC title against the Raiders. The Raiders were victorious over the Chargers of a score 34–27. The Raiders ended up moving on to play in Super Bowl 15 defeating the Eagles 27–10. On November 22, 1982, the Raiders hosted their first Monday Night football game in Los Angeles against the San Diego Chargers. The Chargers led the game in the 1st half 24–0 until the Raiders came into the 2nd half and made a huge comeback and defeated the San Diego Chargers 28–24. On October 10, 2010, the Raiders ended their 13-game losing streak to the San Diego Chargers with a score of 35–27. The Raiders hold the overall series advantage at 67–57–2.

Historical rivals

Miami Dolphins

The Raiders faced the Miami Dolphins thrice in the early 1970s. The Raiders defeated the Dolphins 21–14 in the 1970 divisional round, then the Dolphins exacted revenge in the 1973 AFC Championship Game by winning 27–10 on their way to Super Bowl VIII. The next year in the divisional playoffs the Raiders trailed Miami 26–21; in the final minute the Raiders drove to the Miami eight-yard line; a desperation pass by Ken Stabler was caught in traffic by Clarence Davis in the play known as the "Sea of Hands."

Pittsburgh Steelers

The Pittsburgh Steelers' rivalry with the Raiders has historically been very tight; as of the 2018 season the Raiders lead the regular-season series 13 wins to 10, and their playoff rivalry is tied 3–3. The rivalry was extremely intense during the 1970s, and considered by many to be one of the most vicious and brutal in the history of Professional football. From 1972 to 1976 the teams would meet in the playoffs five consecutive times, including three consecutive AFC Championship games. The rivalry really kicked off during the teams’ first playoff meeting at the 1972 AFC divisional round in Pittsburgh. Considered to be one of the most famous plays in NFL history, the "Immaculate Reception", as it was dubbed, saw the Steelers beat the Raiders on a controversial last-second play. During the 1975 AFC Championship game, Raiders strong safety George Atkinson delivered a hit on Pittsburgh wide receiver Lynn Swann, which left him concussed. When the two teams met in the 1976 season opener, Atkinson again hit Swann, this time with a forearm to the head, causing yet another concussion. After the second incident, Steelers head coach Chuck Noll referred to Atkinson as part of the "criminal element" in the NFL. Atkinson filed a $2 million defamation lawsuit against Noll and the Steelers, which he lost. The rivalry reached its apex in the late 1980s, cooled when the teams faced each other only sporadically, then headed up again in the late 1990s before cooling again.

The four most recent contests between the Raiders and Steelers harkened back to the rivalry's history of bitterness and close competition. On December 6, 2009, the 3–8 Raiders helped spoil the defending champions' quest for the playoffs as the game lead changed five times in the fourth quarter and a Louis Murphy touchdown with 11 seconds to go won it 27–24 for the Raiders. Oakland was then beaten 35–3 by Pittsburgh on November 21, 2010; this game brought out the roughness of the rivalry's 1970s history when Steelers quarterback Ben Roethlisberger was punched by Raiders defensive end Richard Seymour following a touchdown. On November 8, 2015, the Steelers outplayed the Raiders for a 38–35 victory. During the game, the Raiders defense allowed wide receiver Antonio Brown to catch 17 passes for 284 yards. Both are Steelers team records and the 284 yards is the 7th most yards receiving in a game in NFL history. In 2018, the Raiders upset the Steelers again, scoring a late touchdown to take a 24–21 fourth-quarter lead and getting the last laugh when Steelers kicker Chris Boswell slipped and missed a game-tying field goal. This game, which was the teams' final matchup in Oakland, contributed to the Steelers' late-season collapse and missing the playoffs that year.

New England Patriots
The rivalry between the Raiders and New England Patriots dates to their time in the AFL, but was intensified during a 1978 preseason game, when Patriots wide receiver Darryl Stingley was permanently paralyzed after a vicious hit delivered by Raiders free safety Jack Tatum. Before that, New England also lost a playoff game in 1976 to the Raiders; the game is unofficially known as "The Ben Dreith Game" due to a controversial penalty by head referee Dreith. While based in Los Angeles, the team hosted New England in the divisional round of the playoffs in 1986. The game was won by New England and marred by a chaotic rumble between the teams in the end zone as players were leaving the field after the game. The brawl was especially notable for Matt Millen attacking Patriots GM Patrick Sullivan with his helmet. The two teams met in a divisional-round playoff game in 2002, which became known as the "Tuck Rule Game". Late in the game, an incomplete pass, ruled a fumble, by Patriots quarterback Tom Brady was overturned, and New England went on to win in overtime and eventually won the Super Bowl against the heavily favored St. Louis Rams, the Raiders' former crosstown rivals in Los Angeles. Since that game, the Patriots have won five of the last six regular-season contests between the two teams. The first contest being the following year during the 2002 season in Oakland, with the Raiders winning 27–20; they met in the 2005 season opener in New England with the Patriots ruining Randy Moss' debut as a Raider 30–20; the Patriots defeated the Raiders 49–26 in December 2008 in Bill Belichick's 100th regular-season win as Patriots coach; a Patriots 31–19 win during the 2011 season; a scrappy 16–9 Patriots win in the third week of the 2014 season, and the Patriots' 33–8 win in Mexico City in 2017. The Raiders would not beat New England again until 2022, after they relocated to Las Vegas, with a failed lateral pass play by New England at the end of regulation resulting in a walkoff touchdown and a 30-24 win for the Raiders.

New York Jets
The New York Jets began a strong rivalry with the Raiders in the AFL during the 1960s that continued through much of the 1970s, fueled in part by Raider Ike Lassiter breaking star quarterback Joe Namath's jaw during a 1967 game (though Ben Davidson was wrongly blamed), the famous Heidi Game during the 1968 season, and the Raiders' bitter loss to the Jets in the AFL Championship later that season. The rivalry waned in later years, but saw a minor resurgence in the 2000–02 period. The Jets edged the Raiders in the final week of the 2001 season 24–22 on a last-second John Hall field goal; the Raiders hosted the Jets in the Wild Card round the following Saturday and won 38–24. In the 2002 season the Raiders defeated the Jets 26–20 in December, then defeated them again in the AFC Divisional Playoffs, 30–10. The Raiders lost the 37–27 on December 8, 2013, but won the most recent matchup 20–34 on November 1, 2015.

Houston Oilers/Tennessee Titans
The Raiders faced the Houston Oilers throughout the AFL era and twice in AFL playoffs in the late 1960s, winning 40–7 in 1967 on their way to Super Bowl II and 56–7 in the 1969 divisional playoffs. Oakland defeated the Oilers in the 1980 Wild Card playoffs 27–7 and defeated the Titans in the 2002 AFC Championship Game 41–24.

Historic battle of the Bay rivalry

The San Francisco 49ers, located on the other side of San Francisco Bay, were the Raiders' geographic rivals during the Raiders' time in Oakland. The first exhibition game, played in 1967, ended with the 49ers defeating the AFL Raiders 13–10. After the 1970 merger, the 49ers won in Oakland 38–7. As a result, games between the two are referred to as the "Battle of the Bay." Since the two teams play in different conferences, regular-season matchups happen only once every four years. Fans and players of the winning team could claim "bragging rights" as the better team in the area.

On August 20, 2011, in the third week of the preseason, the preseason game between the rivals was marked by fights in restrooms and stands at Candlestick Park, including a shooting outside the stadium in which several were injured. The NFL has decided to cancel all future preseason games between the Raiders and 49ers.

The series ended on November 1, 2018, during a Thursday Night Football broadcast at Levi's Stadium, marking the last time both teams would meet before the Raiders moved to their new home in Las Vegas. The 49ers won the game 34–3 to tie their regular-season series at 7.

Historic battle for Los Angeles rivalry
As mentioned earlier, the Raiders and Los Angeles Rams had a rivalry during the 13 years both teams shared the Los Angeles market. The teams met six times in the regular season in this period; the Raiders won the first meeting of this era, 37–31, on December 18, 1982. The Raiders won four of their six games against the Rams while the teams shared the Los Angeles market.

Ownership, administration and financial operations

Founding of the franchise
Max Winter, a Minneapolis businessman was among the eight proposed franchise owners in the American Football League. In a move typical of the NFL owners who were frightened by the prospect of competition and continually obstructed the new league, they offered Winter an expansion franchise in the NFL. This was after the NFL had rejected Lamar Hunt's feelers, saying they were not interested in expansion. One of many obfuscations put forward by the NFL in its attempt to derail the AFL.

After the AFL's first draft, in which players were selected for the then nameless Minneapolis franchise, Winter reneged from his agreement with the AFL owners and defected to the NFL with a franchise that started play in 1961 and was named the Minnesota Vikings. The Vikings were never an AFL team, nor did they have any association with the AFL. Many of the players (including Abner Haynes) that had been assigned to the UNNAMED and defunct Minneapolis AFL franchise were signed by some of the seven loyal remaining members of the AFL's 'Foolish Club'.

The city of Oakland was awarded the eighth AFL franchise on January 30, 1960. Once the consortium of owners was found for the eighth franchise, the team was named the Raiders. Because many of the defunct Minneapolis franchise's originally drafted players were signed by other AFL teams, the AFL held an 'allocation' draft, in which each team earmarked players that could be chosen by the Raiders.

The Minneapolis group did not take with them any of the rights to players they drafted when they defected to the NFL, because their first draft in that league was in 1961. The Raiders were not originally in Minnesota as some claim. They were a new, charter franchise in the American Football League. One reason they were so weak in the first few years of the AFL was that the other AFL teams did not make quality players available in the allocation draft.

At the time, Oakland seemed an unlikely venue for a professional football team. The city had not asked for a team, there was no ownership group and there was no stadium in Oakland suitable for pro football (the closest stadiums were in Berkeley and San Francisco) and there was already a successful NFL franchise in the Bay Area in the San Francisco 49ers. The AFL owners selected Oakland after Los Angeles Chargers owner Barron Hilton threatened to forfeit his franchise unless a second team was placed on the West Coast.

Upon receiving the franchise, Oakland civic leaders found a number of businesspeople willing to invest in the new team. A limited partnership was formed to own the team headed by managing general partner Y. Charles (Chet) Soda (1908–89), a local real estate developer, and included general partners Ed McGah (1899–1983), Robert Osborne (1898–1968), F. Wayne Valley (1914–86), restaurateur Harvey Binns (1914–82), Don Blessing (1904–2000), and contractor Charles Harney (1902–62) as well as numerous limited partners.

The Raiders finished their first campaign with a 6–8 record, and lost $500,000. Desperately in need of money to continue running the team, Valley received a $400,000 loan from Buffalo Bills founder Ralph C. Wilson Jr.

After the conclusion of the first season Soda dropped out of the partnership, and on January 17, 1961, Valley, McGah and Osborne bought out the remaining four general partners. Soon after, Valley and McGah purchased Osborne's interest, with Valley named as the managing general partner.

In 1962 Valley hired Al Davis, a former assistant coach for the San Diego Chargers, as head coach and general manager. In April 1966 Davis left the Raiders after being named AFL Commissioner. Two months later, the league announced its merger with the NFL. With the merger, the position of commissioner was no longer needed, and Davis entered into discussions with Valley about returning to the Raiders. On July 25, 1966, Davis returned as part owner of the team. He purchased a 10% interest in the team for US$18,000, and became the team's third general partner. As part of the deal, Davis was also given control over football operations.

In 1972, with Wayne Valley out of the country for several weeks attending the Olympic Games in Munich, Davis's attorneys drafted a revised partnership agreement that made him the new managing general partner, with complete control over all of the Raiders' operations. McGah, a supporter of Davis, signed the agreement. Under partnership law, by a 2–1 vote of the general partners, the new agreement was thus ratified. Valley was furious when he discovered this, and immediately filed suit to have the new agreement overturned, but the court sided with Davis and McGah.

In 1976 Valley sold his interest in the team. Although Davis only owned 25 percent of the team, no other partners have had any voice in team operations since.

Current ownership structure
Legally, the club is owned by a nine-member limited partnership. A. D. Football, Inc., the company founded by Al Davis to hold his interest, is the general partner. The heirs of the original eight-member ownership group are limited partners.

From 1972 onward, Davis had exercised total control of the Raiders as president of A.D. Football, Inc. Although exact ownership stakes are not known, it has been reported that Davis owned 47% of the team shares before his death in 2011. The limited partners have almost no role in team operations, though they were briefly mentioned in team media guides. Many of them had not watched, let alone attended, Raiders games in years at the time of Davis' death.

Ed McGah, the last surviving member of the original ownership group, died in September 1983. Upon his death, his interest was devised to a family trust, of which his son, E.J. McGah, was the trustee. The younger McGah was himself a part-owner of the team, as a limited partner, and died in 2002. Several members of the McGah family filed suit against Davis in October 2003, alleging mismanagement of the team by Davis. The lawsuit sought monetary damages and to remove Davis and A. D. Football, Inc. as general partner. Among their specific complaints, the McGahs alleged that Davis failed to provide them with detailed financial information previously provided to Ed and E.J. McGah. The Raiders countered that—under the terms of the partnership agreement as amended in 1972—upon the death of the elder McGah in 1983, his general partner interest converted to that of a limited partner. The team continued to provide the financial information to the younger McGah as a courtesy, though it was under no obligation to do so.

The majority of the lawsuit was dismissed in April 2004, when an Alameda County Superior Court judge ruled that the case lacked merit since none of the other partners took part in the lawsuit. In October 2005 the lawsuit was settled out of court. The terms of the settlement are confidential, but it was reported that under its terms Davis purchased the McGah family's interest in the Raiders (approximately 31%), which gave him for the first time a majority interest, speculated to be approximately 67% of the team. As a result of the settlement, confidential details concerning Al Davis and the ownership of the Raiders were not released to the public.

In 2006 it was reported that Davis had been attempting to sell the 31% ownership stake in the team obtained from the McGah family. He was unsuccessful in this effort, reportedly because the sale would not give the purchaser any control of the Raiders, even in the event of Davis's death.

Al Davis died on October 8, 2011, at age 82. According to a 1999 partnership agreement, Davis' interest passed to his wife, Carol. After Davis' death, Raiders chief executive Amy Trask said that the team "will remain in the Davis family." Al and Carol's son, Mark, inherited his father's old post as managing general partner and serves as operating head of the franchise. Unlike his father, Mark mostly leaves on-field matters to the football operations staff.

Financial operations
According to a 2017 report released by Forbes Magazine, the Raiders' overall team value is US 2.38 billion ranked 19th out of 32 NFL teams. This valuation was made after the team's announcement of relocation to Las Vegas by 2020 and into a new stadium which moved the team's value up 19 percent.

Although the team has regularly sold out since 2013, the team ranked in the bottom three in league attendance from 2003 to 2005, and failed to sell out a majority of their home games. One of the reasons cited for the poor attendance figures was the decision to issue costly personal seat licenses (PSLs) upon the Raiders' return to Oakland in 1995. The PSLs, which ranged in cost from $250 to $4,000, were meant to help repay the $200 million it cost the city of Oakland and Alameda County to expand the Oakland Coliseum. They were only valid for ten years, while other teams issue them permanently. As a result, fewer than 31,000 PSLs were sold for a stadium that holds twice that number. From 1995 until the lifting of the policy in 2014 television blackouts of Raiders home games were common.

In November 2005 the team announced that it was taking over ticket sales from the privately run Oakland Football Marketing Association (OFMA), and abolishing PSLs. In February 2006 the team also announced that it would lower ticket prices for most areas of the Oakland Coliseum. Just prior to the start of the 2006 NFL season, the Raiders revealed that they had sold 37,000 season tickets, up from 29,000 the previous year. Despite the team's 2–14 record, they sold out six of their eight home games in 2006.

Legal battles
The Raiders and Al Davis have been involved in several lawsuits throughout their history, including ones against the NFL. When the NFL declined to approve the Raiders' move from Oakland to Los Angeles in 1980, the team joined the Los Angeles Memorial Coliseum Commission in a lawsuit against the league alleging a violation of antitrust laws. The Coliseum Commission received a settlement from the NFL of $19.6 million in 1987. In 1986, Davis testified on behalf of the United States Football League in their unsuccessful antitrust lawsuit against the NFL. He was the only NFL owner to do so.

After relocating back to Oakland, the team sued the NFL for interfering with their negotiations to build a new stadium at Hollywood Park prior to the move. The Raiders' lawsuit further contended that they had the rights to the Los Angeles market, and thus were entitled to compensation from the league for giving up those rights by moving to Oakland. A jury found in favor of the NFL in 2001, but the verdict was overturned a year later due to alleged juror misconduct. In February 2005, a California Court of Appeal unanimously upheld the original verdict.

When the Raiders moved back from Los Angeles in 1995, the city of Oakland and the Oakland–Alameda County Coliseum Authority agreed to sell Personal Seat Licenses (PSLs) to help pay for the renovations to their stadium. But after games rarely sold out, the Raiders filed suit, claiming that they were misled by the city and the Coliseum Authority with the false promise that there would be sellouts. On November 2, 2005, a settlement was announced, part of which was the abolishment of PSLs as of the 2006 season.

Trademark and trade dress dilution
In 1996 the team sued the NFL in Santa Clara County, in a lawsuit that ultimately included 22 separate causes of action. Included in the team's claims were claims that the Tampa Bay Buccaneers' pirate logo diluted the team's California trademark in its own pirate logo and for trade dress dilution on the ground that the League had improperly permitted other teams (including the Buccaneers and Carolina Panthers) to adopt colors for their uniforms similar to those of the Raiders. Among other things, the lawsuit sought an injunction to prevent the Buccaneers and Panthers from wearing their uniforms while playing in California. In 2003 these claims were dismissed on summary judgment because the relief sought would violate the Commerce Clause of the United States Constitution.

BALCO scandal
In 2003 a number of current and former Oakland players such as Bill Romanowski, Tyrone Wheatley, Barrett Robbins, Chris Cooper and Dana Stubblefield were named as clients of the Bay Area Laboratory Co-Operative (BALCO). BALCO was an American company led by founder and owner Victor Conte. Also in 2003, journalists Lance Williams and Mark Fainaru-Wada investigated the company's role in a drug sports scandal later referred to as the BALCO Affair. BALCO marketed tetrahydrogestrinone ("the Clear"), a then-undetected, performance-enhancing steroid developed by chemist Patrick Arnold. Conte, BALCO vice president James Valente, weight trainer Greg Anderson and coach Remi Korchemny had supplied a number of high-profile sports stars from the United States and Europe with the Clear and human growth hormone for several years.

Headquartered in Burlingame, BALCO was founded in 1984. Officially, BALCO was a service business for blood and urine analysis and food supplements. In 1988, Victor Conte offered free blood and urine tests to a group of athletes known as the BALCO Olympians. He then was allowed to attend the Summer Olympics in Seoul, South Korea. From 1996 Conte worked with well-known American football star Bill Romanowski, who proved to be useful to establish new connections to athletes and coaches.

Players of note

Current roster

Pro Football Hall of Fame members
The Pro Football Hall of Fame has inducted 17 players who made their primary contribution to professional football while with the Raiders, in addition to coach-owner-commissioner Al Davis, head coach John Madden, head coach Tom Flores and executive Ron Wolf. The Raiders' total is of 30 Hall of Famers.

Notes:
 Hall of Famers who made the major part of their primary contribution for the Raiders are listed in bold.
 Hall of Famers who spent only a minor portion of their career with the Raiders are listed in normal font.

Retired numbers
The Raider organization does not retire the jersey numbers of former players on an official or unofficial basis. All 99 numbers are available for any player, regardless of stature or who previously wore the number.

Individual awards

Career leaders
Passing yards: 35,222	 Derek Carr (active player) (2014–2022)
Pass completions: 3,201 Derek Carr (active player) (2014–2022)
Passing touchdowns: 217 Derek Carr (active player) (2014–2022)
Rushing yards: 8,545 Marcus Allen (1982–1992)
Rushing touchdowns: 79 Marcus Allen (1982–1992)
Receptions: 1,070 Tim Brown (1988–2003)
Receiving yards: 14,734 Tim Brown (1988–2003)
Receiving touchdowns: 99 Tim Brown (1988–2003)
Total touchdowns: 104 Tim Brown (1988–2003)
Points: 1,799 Sebastian Janikowski (2000–2016)
Field goals made: 414 Sebastian Janikowski (2000–2016)
Total punt yardage: 48,215 Shane Lechler (2000–2012)
Punting average: 47.5 Shane Lechler (2000–2012)
Kickoff return yards: 4,841 Chris Carr (2005–2007)
Punt Return yards: 3,272 Tim Brown (1988–2003)
Pass interceptions: 39 Willie Brown (1967–1978), Lester Hayes (1977–1986)
Defended passes/pass deflections: 84 Charles Woodson (1998–2015)
Sacks: 107.5 Greg Townsend (1983–1997)
Forced fumbles: 18 Charles Woodson (1998–2015)
Winningest coach: 103 John Madden (1969–1978)

Single-season leaders
Passing yards: 4,804 Derek Carr (2021)
Passing touchdowns: 34 Daryle Lamonica (1969)
Rushing yards: 1,759 Marcus Allen (1985)
Rushing touchdowns: 16 Pete Banaszak (1975)
Receptions: 107 Darren Waller (2020)
Receiving yards: 1,516 Davante Adams (2022)
Receiving touchdowns: 16 Art Powell (1963)
Total touchdowns: 18 Marcus Allen (1984)
Points: 150 Daniel Carlson (2021)
Field goals made: 40 Daniel Carlson (2021)
Total punt yardage: 4,930 Marquette King (2014)
Punting average: 51.1 Shane Lechler (2009)
Kickoff return yards: 1,762 Chris Carr (2006)
Punt return yards: 692 Fulton Walker (1985)
Pass interceptions: 13 Lester Hayes (1980)
Sacks: 16.0 Derrick Burgess (2005)

All-Pro selections
The following Raiders players have been named to the All-Pro team:
 QB Daryle Lamonica, Ken Stabler,  Rich Gannon (2)
 RB Clem Daniels (4), Marcus Allen (3), Josh Jacobs (1)
 FB Hewritt Dixon, Marcel Reece (1)
 WR Cliff Branch (3), Tim Brown, Fred Biletnikoff (2), Art Powell, Davante Adams (1)
 TE Dave Casper, Todd Christensen (4), Billy Cannon (2)
 T Art Shell (4), Harry Schuh, Lincoln Kennedy (2)
 G Gene Upshaw (5), Steve Wisniewski (2), Kelechi Osemele (1)
 C Jim Otto (10), Barret Robbins (1)
 DE Howie Long, Khalil Mack (2), Ben Davidson (1)
 DT Tom Keating, Dan Birdwell, Bill Pickel, Chester McGlockton, Darrell Russell (1) 
 LB Ted Hendricks (3), Rod Martin, Archie Matsos, Khalil Mack (1)
 CB Willie Brown, Nnamdi Asomugha (4), Dave Grayson, Charles Woodson (3), Fred Williamson, Kent McCloughan, Mike Haynes (2), Lester Hayes (1)
 S Tom Morrow, Ronnie Lott, Rod Woodson, Charles Woodson (1)
 K Jeff Jaeger (1)
 P Shane Lechler (6), Ray Guy (3), Jeff Gossett, A. J. Cole III (1)

Pro Bowl selections
The following Raiders players have been named to the Pro Bowl:
 QB Daryle Lamonica, Ken Stabler, Rich Gannon (4), Derek Carr (3), Cotton Davidson, Tom Flores, George Blanda, Jeff Hostetler (1)
 RB Marcus Allen (5), Clem Daniels (4), Marv Hubbard (3), Josh Jacobs (2), Kenny King, Greg Pruitt, Bo Jackson, Latavius Murray (1)
 FB Hewritt Dixon (4), Marcel Reece (4), Alan Miller (1)
 WR Tim Brown (9), Fred Biletnikoff (6), Art Powell, Cliff Branch (4), Warren Wells, Amari Cooper (2), Jerry Rice, Hunter Renfrow, Davante Adams (1)
 TE Dave Casper, Todd Christensen (5), Raymond Chester (4), Billy Cannon, Ethan Horton, Zach Miller, Jared Cook, Darren Waller (1)
 T Art Shell (8), Harry Schuh, Lincoln Kennedy (3), Henry Lawrence, Donald Penn (2), Bob Brown (1)
 G Steve Wisniewski (8), Gene Upshaw (7), Wayne Hawkins (5), Kelechi Osemele (2), Max Montoya, Kevin Gogan (1)
 C Jim Otto (12), Don Mosebar (3), Rodney Hudson (2), Dave Dalby, Barret Robbins (1)
 DE Howie Long (8), Ben Davidson, Khalil Mack (3), Greg Townsend, Derrick Burgess, Maxx Crosby (2), Ike Lassiter (1)
 DT Chester McGlockton (4), Tom Keating, Darrell Russell, Richard Seymour (2), Dave Costa, Dan Birdwell, Otis Sistrunk (1)
 LB Phil Villapiano, Ted Hendricks (4), Dan Conners (3), Rod Martin (2), Archie Matsos, Gus Otto, Matt Millen, Denzel Perryman (1)
 CB Willie Brown (7), Lester Hayes, Terry McDaniel (5), Charles Woodson (4), Fred Williamson, Dave Grayson, Mike Haynes, Nnamdi Asomugha (3), Kent McCloughan (2)
 S Jack Tatum (3), George Atkinson, Vann McElroy (2) Charles Woodson, Ronnie Lott, Rod Woodson, Reggie Nelson (1)
 K Jeff Jaeger, Sebastian Janikowski (1)
 P Ray Guy (7), Shane Lechler (7), Jeff Gossett, A. J. Cole III (1)
 LS Jon Condo (2)

Front office and coaching staff

Coaches/Executives
The coaches and executives that have contributed to the history & success of the Los Angeles/Oakland/Las Vegas Raiders franchise are as follows:
 Al Davis: head coach (1963–1965), general manager/owner (1966–2011), AFL commissioner (1966)
 Ron Wolf: scout/executive, director of player personnel (1963–1974; 1978–1989)
 John Rauch: head coach (1965–1968)
 John Madden: head coach (1969–1978)
 Tom Flores: assistant head coach, executive assistant coach (1972–1978), head coach (1979–1987), executive (1988)
 John Herrera: business & public relations (1967–1978), director of public relations (1978–1982), senior executive (1985–2012)
 Al LoCasale: executive assistant (1969–2003)
 Ken Herock: scout/executive assistant, scout/personnel director (1970–1975), player personnel (1984–1986), executive assistant (1997–1998)
 Art Shell: assistant head coach (1983–1989), head coach (1989–1994, 2006)
 Amy Trask: chief executive officer (1987–2013)
 Bruce Allen: senior executive (1995–2003)
 Jon Gruden: head coach (1998–2001; 2018–2021)
 Reggie McKenzie: general manager (2012–2018)
 Marc Badain: president (2013–2021)
 Jack Del Rio: head coach (2015–2017)
 Mike Mayock: general manager (2019–2021)

Current staff

See also

Sports in the Las Vegas metropolitan area

References

External links

 
 Las Vegas Raiders at the National Football League official website

 
American Football League teams
National Football League teams
Sports teams in Las Vegas
American football teams established in 1960
1960 establishments in California